Okanagan Falls (also known as OK Falls) is a community located on the south end of Skaha Lake in British Columbia.

History
The community was founded in 1893 as Dogtown, which was derived from the name Dog Lake ("skaha" means "dog" in the Okanagan language). The current name derives from a small set of the falls that used to lie on the Okanagan River at the outlet of Skaha Lake. The falls have since been submerged beneath the lake due to the construction of a dam on the river.

In 2012, Okanagan Falls expressed interest in incorporating as a municipality, and in December 2020 the Regional District of Okanagan-Similkameen approved a study on incorporating the community as a municipality.

Geological features 

Nestled at the head of a giant spillway formed as the discharge of Glacial Lake Penticton was constrained between Mount McLellan to the west and Peach Cliff to the east.
Okanagan Falls has a diverse assemblage of geological attractions.

Peach Cliff 
Peach Cliff is a dominant landmark to the east of Okanagan Falls. It consists of trachyte of Eocene age.
Peach Cliff is home to herds of mule deer and a sizeable herd of California bighorn sheep.
Perched high on a spur of Peach Cliff is Balancing Rock, a large glacial erratic supported by a couple of granitic cobbles.

Indian Head 
Southwest of Okanagan Falls, are the ragged cliffs of Indian Head, one of the most unusual rock formations in the Okanagan. 
Consisting of dark volcanic rocks overlying a lighter conglomerate. This formation contains spectacular megabreccia,

Mahoney Lake 
South of Okanagan Falls lies meromictic Mahoney Lake, home to spectacular blooms of purple sulphur bacteria.
This purple is contrasted by nearby Green Lake, which is coloured by the precipitation of calcium carbonates in the water column.

Tourism 
The Dominion Radio Astrophysical Observatory is a research facility founded in 1960 and located southwest of Okanagan Falls and Penticton.

The site houses three instruments – an interferometric radio telescope, a  single-dish antenna, and a solar flux monitor – and supports engineering laboratories. The DRAO is operated by the Herzberg Institute of Astrophysics of the National Research Council of the Canadian government.

The observatory was named an IEEE Milestone for first radio astronomical observations using VLBI. There is a self-guided tour available at the facility during daylight hours.

Parks 
Christie Memorial Provincial Park is located on the south shoreline of Skaha Lake. Okanagan Falls Provincial Park is also nearby.

References

External links 

 

Designated places in British Columbia
Unincorporated settlements in British Columbia
Populated places in the South Okanagan
British Columbia populated places on the Okanogan River
Populated places in the Okanagan Country